The 2009 Sulawesi superbolide was an atmospheric fireball blast over Indonesia on October 8, 2009, at approximately 03:00 UTC (11:00 local time), near the coastal city of Watampone in South Sulawesi, island of Sulawesi. The meteoritic impactor broke up at an estimated height of 15–20 km. The impact energy of the bolide was estimated in the 10 to 50 kiloton TNT equivalent range, with the higher end of this range being more likely. The likely size of the impactor was 5–10 m diameter.

References

External links 
 

Explosions in 2009
2009 Sulawesi superbolid
Historical events in Indonesia
2009 in Indonesia
2009 in space
History of Sulawesi
October 2009 events in Asia